Chionodes molitor is a moth in the family Gelechiidae. It is found in North America, where it has been recorded from northern Vermont, southern Ohio, Indiana and Illinois.

References

Chionodes
Moths described in 1999
Moths of North America